Instant-runoff voting (IRV) is a type of ranked preferential voting method. It uses a majority voting rule in single-winner elections where there are more than two candidates. It is commonly referred to as ranked-choice voting (RCV) in the United States (although there are other forms of ranked voting), preferential voting in Australia, where it has seen the widest adoption; in the United Kingdom, it is generally called alternative vote (AV), whereas in some other countries it is referred to as the single transferable vote, which usually means only its multi-winner variant. All these names are often used inconsistently.

Voters in IRV elections rank the candidates in order of preference. Ballots are initially counted for each voter's top choice. If a candidate has more than half of the first-choice
votes, that candidate wins. If not, then the candidate with the fewest votes is eliminated, and the voters who selected the defeated candidate as a first choice then have their votes added to the totals of their next choice. This process continues until a candidate has more than half of the votes. When the field is reduced to two, it has become an "instant runoff" that allows a comparison of the top two candidates head-to-head. IRV is not a proportional voting system but rather a "winner takes all" method, as it elects only one winner in an election (in one district).

IRV is used in national elections in several countries. It is used to elect members of the Australian House of Representatives, as well as most state lower houses and in some local government elections. It is the method used to elect the President of India, the President of Ireland, and (in a modified form) the National Parliament of Papua New Guinea. It is used by many political parties for internal primaries/elections to elect party leaders and presidential/prime ministerial candidates, and by private associations for various voting purposes such as choosing the Academy Award for Best Picture.

Election procedure

Process

In instant-runoff voting, as with other ranked election methods, each voter ranks the list of candidates in order of preference. Under a common ballot layout, the voter marks a '1' beside the most preferred candidate, a '2' beside the second-most preferred, and so forth, in ascending order.

The mechanics of the process are the same regardless of how many candidates the voter ranks, and how many are left unranked. In most implementations, the voter ranks as many or as few choices as they wish.

The instant-runoff vote counting procedure is as follows:

 Eliminate the candidate appearing as the first preference on the fewest ballots.
 If only one candidate remains, elect this candidate and stop.
 Otherwise go to 1.

If there is an exact tie for last place in numbers of votes, various tie-breaking rules determine which candidate to eliminate. The set of all candidates with the fewest first-order votes whose votes together total less than any other candidate's can be eliminated without changing the outcome. This bulk elimination can bypass irrelevant ties, for example if one candidate receives 15 first-order votes and four others receive 5, 5, 3, and 1, and no other candidate receives fewer than 15, all four of the latter candidates will be eliminated during the next four rounds, and so can be eliminated immediately without considering the tie.

Ballots assigned to eliminated candidates are added to the totals of one of the remaining candidates based on the next preference ranked on each ballot. The process repeats until one candidate achieves a majority of votes cast for continuing candidates. Ballots on which all of a voter's ranked candidates are eliminated become inactive.

Candidate order on the ballot paper

The common ways to list candidates on a ballot paper are alphabetically or by random lot. In some cases, candidates may also be grouped by political party. Alternatively, Robson Rotation involves randomly changing candidate order for each print run.

Party strategies
Where preferential voting is used for the election of an assembly or council, parties and candidates often advise their supporters on their lower preferences, especially in Australia where a voter must rank all candidates to cast a valid ballot. This can lead to "preference deals", a form of pre-election bargaining, in which smaller parties agree to direct their voters in return for support from the winning party on issues critical to the small party. It can also sometimes lead to joint campaigning between candidates with similar platforms. However, these strategies rely on the assumption that supporters of a party or candidate are receptive to advice on the other preferences on their ballot.

Counting logistics
Most IRV elections historically have been tallied by hand, including in elections to Australia's House of Representatives and most state governments. In the modern era, voting equipment can be used to administer the count either partially or fully.

In Australia, the returning officer now usually declares the two candidates that are most likely to win each seat. The votes are always counted by hand at the polling station monitored by scrutineers from each candidate. The first part of the count is to record the first choice for all candidates. Votes for candidates other than the two likely winners are then allocated to them in a second pass. The whole process of counting the votes by hand and allocating preferences is typically completed within two hours on election night at a cost of $7.68 per elector in 2010 to run the entire election.

Ireland in its presidential elections has several dozen counting centers around the nation. Each center reports its totals and receives instructions from the central office about which candidate or candidates to eliminate in the next round of counting based on which candidate is in last place. The count typically is completed the day after the election, as in 1997.

In the United States, nearly all jurisdictions that use this format—like Maine, Oakland and San Francisco—administer IRV elections on voting machines, with optical scanning machines recording preferences and software tallying the IRV algorithm as soon as all ballots are recorded. In its first use of IRV in 2009, Minneapolis tallied first choices on optical scan equipment at the polls and then used a central hand-count for the IRV tally, but has since administered elections without hand tallies Portland, Maine in 2011 used its usual voting machines to tally first choice at the polls, then a central scan with different equipment if an IRV tally was necessary.

The election results from IRV cannot be counted additively: all ballots must be present prior to the first elimination. Methods like plurality voting and pairwise voting can divide the work of counting and sum the results as more votes are reported. To produce pairwise results, each candidate ranked on a ballot receives one vote against each alternative ranked lower and each not ranked on that ballot; equal rankings, including non-ranked candidates, are ties and no vote is tallied. These tallies can be summed to produce a complete matrix of pairwise elections, which can then be used to compute the Smith set or to calculate the outcomes of Schulze, Minimax, Ranked Pairs, and other methods.

IRV is very unlikely to give rise to a tie when the number of voters is large. For this reason it is sometimes advocated as part of a tie break for methods (such as the Smith set) which do not have this property: see Smith/IRV and Tideman's Alternative.

Voter confusion
Research shows that voters in general can understand and use IRV. Various surveys in the U.S. found 80%–90% of voters reported understanding the ballot very well, and 90% reported it was easy to use. Voter comprehension increased with repeated use, eliminating demographic disparities over time. Older voters were more likely to say they found the system confusing, but in practice correctly completed IRV ballots at the same rate.

Invalid ballots and incomplete ballots

All forms of ranked choice voting reduce to plurality when all ballots rank only one candidate.  By extension, ballots for which all candidates ranked are eliminated are equivalent to votes for any non-winner in plurality, and considered exhausted.

Because the ballot marking is more complex, there can be an increase in spoiled ballots. In Australia, voters are required to write a number beside every candidate, and the rate of spoiled ballots can be five times higher than plurality voting elections. Since Australia has compulsory voting, however, it is difficult to tell how many ballots are deliberately spoiled. Where complete rankings are not required, a ballot may become inactive if none of the ranked choices on that ballot advance to the next round.

Most jurisdictions with IRV do not require complete rankings and may use columns to indicate preference instead of numbers. In American elections with IRV, more than 99% of voters typically cast a valid ballot.

A 2015 study of four local U.S. elections that used IRV found that inactive ballots occurred often enough in each of them that the winner of each election did not receive a majority of votes cast in the first round. The rate of inactive ballots in each election ranged from a low of 9.6% to a high of 27.1%. As one point of comparison, the number of votes cast in the 190 regularly scheduled primary runoff elections for the U.S. House and U.S. Senate from 1994 to 2016 decreased from the initial primary on average by 39%,
according to a 2016 study by FairVote.

Terminology
Instant-runoff voting derives its name from the way the ballot count simulates a series of runoffs, similar to an exhaustive ballot system, except that voter preferences do not change between rounds. It is also known as the alternative vote, transferable vote, ranked-choice voting (RCV), single-seat ranked-choice voting, or preferential voting.

Britons and New Zealanders generally call IRV the "alternative vote" (AV). while in Canada it is called "ranked choice voting". Australians, who use IRV for most single winner elections, call IRV "preferential voting". American NGO FairVote uses the terminology "ranked choice voting" to refer to IRV in the case of single-winner offices and to refer to single transferable vote in the case of multi-winner offices. Jurisdictions using IRV such as San Francisco, California, Maine, Alaska, and Minneapolis, Minnesota have codified the term "ranked choice voting" in their laws. The San Francisco Department of Elections claims that the word "instant" in term "instant runoff voting" could confuse voters into expecting results to be immediately available.

IRV is occasionally referred to (rather confusingly) either as Hare's method (after Sir Thomas Hare) or as Ware's method after the American William Robert Ware. When the single transferable vote (STV) method is applied to a single-winner election, it becomes IRV; the government of Ireland has called IRV "proportional representation" based on the fact that the same ballot form is used to elect its president by IRV and parliamentary seats by STV, but IRV is a winner-take-all election method. State law in South Carolina and Arkansas use "instant runoff" to describe the practice of having certain categories of absentee voters cast ranked-choice ballots before the first round of an election and counting those ballots in any subsequent runoff elections.

Properties, advantages and disadvantages

Wasted votes and Condorcet winners 
Compared to a plurality voting system that rewards only the top vote-getter, instant-runoff voting mitigates the problem of wasted votes. However, it does not eliminate this problem, or ensure the election of a Condorcet winner, which is the candidate who would win a direct election against any other candidate in the race. These issues are illustrated in the following election:

 A wins plurality vote: second place preferences are ignored, so candidate A wins with 36% of the vote as against 34% for C and 30% (10+20) for B.
 C wins IRV vote: candidate B gets the fewest first place votes so is eliminated in the first round. Candidate C gets more of B's second choice preferences than candidate A, winning the second round by 54% (20+34) to 46% (36+10). This result is the same as would occur if there was a primary with 3 candidates and a general election with the two remaining candidates (assuming no voters changed their preferences before the general election). Every voter gets a say in the final runoff, so no votes are wasted.

Bottom Two Runoff 
Here is another way of conducting an IRV election:

 B wins IRV / bottom two runoff: in the first round candidates B and C are in last place, so they go head to head. Candidate A's second place votes go to candidate B, so candidate B wins 66% (36+10+20) to 34% over candidate C. In the second runoff round candidate C has been eliminated so candidates A and B go head to head. Candidate C's second place votes go to candidate B, so candidate B wins 64% (10+20+34) to 36% over candidate A. Bottom Two Runoff is an example of a Condorcet method of voting. This can happen in a scenario where candidate B is a compromise candidate between polarizing candidates A and C.

Resistance to strategy 
Instant-runoff voting has notably high resistance to tactical voting but less to strategic nomination.

Tactical voting 

The Gibbard–Satterthwaite theorem demonstrates that no (deterministic, non-dictatorial) voting method using only the preference rankings of the voters can be entirely immune from tactical voting. This implies that IRV is susceptible to tactical voting in some circumstances.

Research concludes that IRV is one of the voting methods least vulnerable to tactical voting, with theorist Nicolaus Tideman noting that, "alternative voting is quite resistant to strategy," and Australian political analyst Antony Green dismissing suggestions of tactical voting. James Green-Armytage tested four ranked-choice methods, and found the alternative vote to be the second-most-resistant to tactical voting, though it was beaten by a class of AV-Condorcet hybrids, and did not resist strategic withdrawal by candidates well.  These analyses only apply to tactical voting, but not to other forms of manipulation; for example, Tideman and Robinette demonstrate a method by which a candidate modifies their campaign to appeal to a slightly broader range of voters, including those of a popular opponent, so as to "bracket" that opponent out (cause them to be eliminated earlier).

By not meeting the monotonicity, Condorcet winner, and participation criteria, IRV may incentivize forms of tactical voting (such as compromising) when voters have sufficient information about other voters' preferences, such as from accurate pre-election polling. FairVote mentions that monotonicity failure can lead to situations where "having more voters rank [a] candidate first, can cause [the candidate] to switch from being a winner to being a loser." This occurs when a mutual majority exists which would elect a different candidate than the Condorcet candidate and a minority coalition running off to a single candidate exceeds one-half the size of this majority: the minority candidate cannot be eliminated until the mutual majority runs off to a majority winner. Moving the winner to the top of the minority ballots can shrink the minority sufficiently for their candidate to be eliminated, and their votes then cause the election of a different candidate. This situation occurred in the 2009 Burlington mayoral election: had several Kurt Wright voters moved Bob Kiss to the top of their ballots, the winner would have changed from Bob Kiss to Andy Montroll. The change in lower candidates is important: whether votes are shifted to the leading candidate, shifted to a fringe candidate, or discarded altogether is of no importance.

Tactical voting in IRV seeks to alter the order of eliminations in early rounds, to ensure that the original winner is challenged by a stronger opponent in the final round. For example, in a three-party election where voters for both the left and right prefer the centrist candidate to stop the opposing candidate from winning, those voters who care more about defeating the opposition than electing their own candidate may cast a tactical first-preference vote for the centrist candidate.

The 2009 mayoral election in Burlington, Vermont provides an example in which strategy theoretically could have worked but would have been unlikely in practice. In that election, most supporters of the candidate who lost in the final round (a Republican who led in first choices) preferred the Condorcet winner, a Democrat, to the IRV winner, the Progressive Party nominee. If 371 (24.7%) out of the 1,510 backers of the Republican candidate (who also preferred the Democrat over the Progressive candidate for mayor) had insincerely raised the Democrat from their second choice to their first (not changing their rankings relative to their least favorite candidate, the Progressive), the Democrat would then have advanced to the final round (instead of their favorite), defeated any opponent, and proceeded to win the IRV election. This is an example of potential voter regret in that these voters who sincerely ranked their favorite candidate as first, find out after the fact that they caused the election of their least favorite candidate, which can lead to the voting tactic of compromising. Yet because the Republican led in first choices and only narrowly lost the final instant runoff, his backers would have been highly unlikely to pursue such a strategy. This strategy still would not elect the Republican, due to a lack of preferences towards them.

Spoiler effect 

The spoiler effect is when a difference is made to the anticipated outcome of an election due to the presence on the ballot paper of a candidate who (predictably) will lose.  Most often this is when two or more politically similar candidates divide the vote for the more popular end of the political spectrum. That is, each receives fewer votes than a single opponent on the unpopular end of the spectrum who is disliked by the majority of voters but who wins from the advantage that, on that unpopular side, they are unopposed.  Strategic nomination relies on triggering this situation, and requires understanding of both the electoral process and the demographics of the district.

Proponents of IRV claim that IRV eliminates the spoiler effect, since IRV makes it safe to vote honestly for marginal parties: Under a plurality method, voters who sympathize most strongly with a marginal candidate are strongly encouraged to instead vote for a more popular candidate who shares some of the same principles, since that candidate has a much greater chance of being elected and a vote for the marginal candidate will not result in the marginal candidate's election.  An IRV method reduces this problem, since the voter can rank the marginal candidate first and the mainstream candidate second; in the likely event that the fringe candidate is eliminated, the vote is not wasted but is transferred to the second preference.

However, when the third-party candidate is more competitive, they can still act as a spoiler under IRV, by taking away first-choice votes from the more mainstream candidate until that candidate is eliminated, and then that candidate's second-choice votes helping a more-disliked candidate to win.  In these scenarios, it would have been better for the third party voters if their candidate had not run at all (spoiler effect), or if they had voted dishonestly, ranking their favorite second rather than first (favorite betrayal).  This is the same bracketing effect exploited by Robinette and Tideman in their research on strategic campaigning, where a candidate alters their campaign to cause a change in voter honest choice, resulting in the elimination of a candidate who nevertheless remains more preferred by voters.

For example, in the 2009 Burlington, Vermont mayoral election, if the Republican candidate who lost in the final instant runoff had not run, the Democratic candidate would have defeated the winning Progressive candidate.  In that sense, the Republican candidate was a spoiler—(albeit for an opposing Democrat, rather than some political ally) even though leading in first choice support.

By contrast, in the seat of Prahran during the 2014 Victorian State Election, despite the Greens candidate outlasting the more centrist Labor candidate during counting, most of the Labor preferences ultimately helped elect the Greens rather than the further right Liberal candidate. In this case, the Greens candidate, despite only having the third most primary votes, ultimately was not a spoiler and was able to be elected.

In practice, IRV does not seem to discourage candidacies. In Australia's House of Representatives elections in 2007, for example, the average number of candidates in a district was seven, and at least four candidates ran in every district; notwithstanding the fact that Australia only has two major political parties. Every seat was won with a majority of the vote, including several where results would have been different under plurality voting. A study of ballot image data found that all of the 138 RCV elections held in four Bay Area cities in California elected the Condorcet winner, including many with large fields of candidates and 46 where multiple rounds of counting were required to determine a winner.

Proportionality 
IRV is a single-winner application of a proportional voting method, technically single-winner STV with a droop quota (50%+1). Like all winner-take-all voting methods, IRV tends to exaggerate the number of seats won by the largest parties; small parties without majority support in any given constituency are unlikely to earn seats in a legislature, although their supporters will be more likely to be part of the final choice between the two strongest candidates. A simulation of IRV in the 2010 UK general election by the Electoral Reform Society concluded that the election would have altered the balance of seats among the three main parties, but the number of seats won by minor parties would have remained unchanged.

Australia 
Australia, a nation with a long record of using IRV for the election of legislative bodies, has had representation in its parliament broadly similar to that expected by plurality methods.

Medium-sized parties, such as the National Party of Australia, can co-exist with coalition partners such as the Liberal Party of Australia, and can compete against it without fear of losing seats to other parties due to vote splitting, although generally in practice these two parties only compete against each other when a sitting member of the coalition leaves Parliament. IRV is more likely to result in legislatures where no single party has an absolute majority of seats (a hung parliament), but does not generally produce as fragmented a legislature as a fully proportional method, such as is used for the House of Representatives of the Netherlands, where coalitions of numerous small parties are needed for a majority.

Costs 
The costs of printing and counting ballot papers for an IRV election are no different from those of any other method using the same technology. However, the more-complicated counting system may encourage officials to introduce more advanced technology, such as software counters or electronic voting machines. Pierce County, Washington, election officials outlined one-time costs of $857,000 to implement IRV for its elections in 2008, covering software and equipment, voter education and testing.

Because it does not require two separate votes, IRV is assumed to cost less than two-round primary/general or general/runoff election methods. However, in 2009, the auditor of Pierce County reported that the ongoing costs of the system were not necessarily balanced by the costs of eliminating runoffs for most county offices, because those elections may be needed for other offices not elected by IRV. Other jurisdictions have reported immediate cost savings.

Australian elections are counted by hand. The 2010 federal election cost a total of $7.68 per elector of which only a small proportion is the actual counting of votes. Counting is now normally performed in a single pass at the polling center as described above.

The perceived costs or cost savings of adopting an IRV method are commonly used by both supporters and critics. In the 2011 UK Alternative Vote referendum, the NOtoAV campaign was launched with a claim that adopting the method would cost £250 million; commentators argued that this headline figure had been inflated by including £82 million for the cost of the referendum itself, and a further £130 million on the assumption that the UK would need to introduce electronic voting systems, when ministers had confirmed that there was no intention of implementing such technology, whatever the outcome of the election. Automated vote counting is seen by some to have a greater potential for election fraud; IRV supporters counter these claims with recommended audit procedures, or note that automated counting is not required for the method at all.

Negative campaigning 
John Russo, Oakland City Attorney, argued in the Oakland Tribune on 24 July 2006 that "Instant runoff voting is an antidote to the disease of negative campaigning. IRV led to San Francisco candidates campaigning more cooperatively. Under the method, their candidates were less likely to engage in negative campaigning because such tactics would risk alienating the voters who support 'attacked' candidates", reducing the chance that they would support the attacker as a second or third choice. Campaign strategists in New York City reported that after IRV was introduced, they became more careful not to attack other candidates in ways that might offend voters that would otherwise give the campaign a second-choice ranking.

In 2013–2014, the Rutgers-Eagleton Poll surveyed more than 4,800 likely voters in 21 cities after their local city elections—half in cities with IRV elections and 14 in control cities selected by project leaders Caroline Tolbert of the University of Iowa and Todd Donovan of Western Washington University. Among findings, respondents in IRV cities reported candidates spent less time criticizing opponents than in cities that did not use IRV. In the 2013 survey, for example, 5% of respondents said that candidates criticized each other "a great deal of the time" as opposed to 25% in non-IRV cities. An accompanying survey of candidates reported similar findings.

Internationally, Benjamin Reilly suggests instant-runoff voting eases ethnic conflict in divided societies. This feature was a leading argument for why Papua New Guinea adopted instant-runoff voting. However, Lord Alexander's objections to the conclusions of the British Independent Commission on the Voting System's report cites the example of Australia saying "their politicians tend to be, if anything, more blunt and outspoken than our own".

Plural voting 
Some critics of IRV hold that voters supporting major candidates get their second and third place preferences ignored as those candidates are eliminated before their first choice is eliminated. Meanwhile, if you support a fringe candidate, it is more likely that your second and third place choices will be used. In Ann Arbor, Michigan, for example, arguments over IRV in letters to newspapers included the belief that IRV "gives minority candidate voters two votes", because some voters' ballots may count for their first choice in the first round and a lesser choice in a later round. The argument that IRV represents plural voting is sometimes used in arguments over the "fairness" of the method, and has led to several legal challenges in the United States. In every instance, state and federal judges have rejected this argument.

The argument was addressed and rejected by a Michigan court in 1975; in Stephenson v. the Ann Arbor Board of City Canvassers, the court held "majority preferential voting" (as IRV was then known) to be in compliance with the Michigan and United States constitutions, writing:

The same argument was advanced in opposition to IRV in Maine. Governor Paul LePage claimed, ahead of the 2018 primary elections, that IRV would result in "one person, five votes", as opposed to "one person, one vote". In litigation following the results of the 2018 election for Maine's 2nd congressional district, Representative Bruce Poliquin claimed that IRV allowed his opponents to "cast ballots for three different candidates in the same election". Federal judge Lance Walker rejected this claim, and the 1st circuit court denied Poliquin's emergency appeal, leading to Poliquin dropping his claim.

Participation

The effect of IRV on voter turnout is difficult to assess.  In a lengthy 2021 report, researchers at New America, a think tank based in Washington, D. C., said:
With our sample of cases largely limited to municipal and often nonpartisan elections (in relatively engaged localities), the best we can say for RCV [ranked-choice voting], independent of timing considerations, is that it may increase local turnout from a pathetic baseline to a slightly less pathetic level by attracting more, and more diverse, candidates. However, if RCV is able to combine the primary and the general election into a single election, held in November alongside other national elections, it is likely to have a more powerful effect in boosting turnout.

The report conluded:
 And to the extent that RCV combines the primary and the general election into one, it increases turnout.  However, many of the other hoped-for benefits, such as more diverse candidates (by gender, race, and ideology), higher turnout, and more viable parties, are harder to detect. Nor is there any evidence that RCV changes policy outcomes. . . .  In most elections, the candidate who would have won under plurality voting is also the candidate who won under ranked-choice voting.

History and use

History 
This method was considered by Condorcet as early as 1788, though only to condemn it, for its ability to eliminate a candidate preferred by a majority of voters.

IRV can be seen as a special case of the single transferable vote method, which began use in the 1850s. It is historically known as Ware's method, due to the implementation of STV in 1871 at Harvard College by American architect William Robert Ware, who suggested it could also be used for single-winner elections. Unlike the single transferable vote in multi-seat elections, however, the only ballot transfers are from backers of candidates who have been eliminated.

The first known use of an IRV-like method in a governmental election was in the 1893 general election in the Colony of Queensland (in present-day Australia). The variant used for this election was a "contingent vote", where all candidates but two are eliminated in the first round. IRV in its true form was first used in Western Australia, in the 1908 state election. The Hare-Clark system was introduced for the Tasmanian House of Assembly at the 1909 state election.

IRV was introduced for federal (nationwide) elections in Australia after the Swan by-election in October 1918, in response to the rise of the conservative Country Party, representing small farmers. The Country Party split the non-Labor vote in conservative country areas, allowing Labor candidates to win without a majority of the vote. The conservative government of Billy Hughes introduced IRV (in Australia called "preferential voting") as a means of allowing competition between the Coalition parties without putting seats at risk. It was first used at the Corangamite by-election on 14 December 1918, and at a national level at the 1919 election. IRV continued to benefit the Coalition until the 1990 election, when for the first time Labor obtained a net benefit from IRV.

Global use

National level elections

Robert's Rules of Order 

In the United States, the sequential elimination method used by IRV is described in Robert's Rules of Order Newly Revised as an example of preferential voting:The term preferential voting refers to any of a number of voting methods by which, on a single ballot when there are more than two possible choices, the second or less-preferred choices of voters can be taken into account if no candidate or proposition attains a majority. While it is more complicated than other methods of voting in common use, and is not a substitute for the normal procedure of repeated balloting until a majority is obtained, preferential voting is especially useful and fair in an election by mail if it is impractical to take more than one ballot. In such cases, it makes possible a more representative result than under a rule that a plurality shall elect ... Preferential voting has many variations. One method is described here by way of illustration. The instant-runoff voting method is then detailed.

Robert's Rules continues:The system of preferential voting just described should not be used in cases where it is possible to follow the normal procedure of repeated balloting until one candidate or proposition attains a majority. Although this type of preferential ballot is preferable to an election by plurality, it affords less freedom of choice than repeated balloting, because it denies voters the opportunity of basing their second or lesser choices on the results of earlier ballots, and because the candidate or proposition in last place is automatically eliminated and may thus be prevented from becoming a compromise choice.

Two other books on American parliamentary procedure take a similar stance, disapproving of plurality voting and describing preferential voting as an option, if authorized in the bylaws, when repeated balloting is impractical: The Standard Code of Parliamentary Procedure and Riddick's Rules of Procedure.

Similar methods

Runoff voting
The term instant runoff voting is derived from the name of a class of voting methods called runoff voting. In runoff voting voters do not rank candidates in order of preference on a single ballot. Instead a similar effect is achieved by using multiple rounds of voting. All multi-round runoff voting methods allow voters to change their preferences in each round, incorporating the results of the prior round to influence their decision. This is not possible in IRV, as participants vote only once, and this prohibits certain forms of tactical voting that can be prevalent in "standard" runoff voting.

Exhaustive ballot
A method closer to IRV is the exhaustive ballot. In this method—one familiar to fans of the television show American Idol—one candidate is eliminated after each round, and many rounds of voting are used, rather than just two. Because holding many rounds of voting on separate days is generally expensive, the exhaustive ballot is not used for large-scale, public elections.

Two-round methods
The simplest form of runoff voting is the two-round system, which typically excludes all but two candidates after the first round, rather than gradually eliminating candidates over a series of rounds. Eliminations can occur with or without allowing and applying preference votes to choose the final two candidates. A second round of voting or counting is only necessary if no candidate receives an overall majority of votes. This method is used in Mali, France and the Finnish and Slovenian presidential election.

Contingent vote

The contingent vote, also known as Top-two IRV, or batch-style, is the same as IRV except that if no candidate achieves a majority in the first round of counting, all but the two candidates with the most votes are eliminated, and the second preferences for those ballots are counted. As in IRV, there is only one round of voting.

Under a variant of contingent voting used in Sri Lanka, and the elections for Mayor of London in the United Kingdom, voters rank a specified maximum number of candidates. In London, the Supplementary Vote allows voters to express first and second preferences only. Sri Lankan voters rank up to three candidates for the President of Sri Lanka.

While similar to "sequential-elimination" IRV, top-two can produce different results. Excluding more than one candidate after the first count might eliminate a candidate who would have won under sequential elimination IRV. Restricting voters to a maximum number of preferences is more likely to exhaust ballots if voters do not anticipate which candidates will finish in the top two. This can encourage voters to vote more tactically, by ranking at least one candidate they think is likely to win.

Conversely, a practical benefit of 'contingent voting' is expediency and confidence in the result with only two rounds. Particularly in elections with few (e.g., fewer than 100) voters, numerous ties can destroy confidence. Heavy use of tie-breaking rules leaves uncomfortable doubts over whether the winner might have changed if a recount had been performed.

Larger runoff process
IRV may also be part of a larger runoff process:
 Some jurisdictions that hold runoff elections allow absentee (only) voters to submit IRV ballots, because the interval between votes is too short for a second round of absentee voting. IRV ballots enable absentee votes to count in the second (general) election round if their first choice does not make the runoff. Arkansas, South Carolina and Springfield, Illinois adopt this approach. Louisiana uses it only for members of the United States Service or who reside overseas.
 IRV can quickly eliminate weak candidates in early rounds of an exhaustive ballot runoff, using rules to leave the desired number of candidates for further balloting.
 IRV allows an arbitrary victory threshold in a single round of voting, e.g., 60%. In such cases a second vote may be held to confirm the winner.
 IRV elections that require a majority of cast ballots but not that voters rank all candidates may require more than a single IRV ballot due to exhausted ballots.
 Robert's Rules recommends preferential voting for elections by mail and requiring a majority of cast votes to elect a winner, giving IRV as their example. For in-person elections, they recommend repeated balloting until one candidate receives an absolute majority of all votes cast. Repeated voting allows voters to turn to a candidate as a compromise who polled poorly in the initial election.

The common feature of these IRV variations is that one vote is counted per ballot per round, with rules that eliminate the weakest candidate(s) in successive rounds. Most IRV implementations drop the requirement for a majority of cast ballots.

Equal rankings
Unlike many single-winner methods, instant-runoff cannot accept equal rankings, and must discard ballots with multiple first-preferred remaining alternatives: such ballots would be equivalent to casting multiple ballots in a plurality election. The inability to cast equal votes—including the inability to truncate ballots in some jurisdictional rules—creates difficulties for the epistemic properties of democracy.  Under theories of public reason, a democratic decision uses the knowledge of the whole voting body. When a voter has no preference, or decides themselves that their ability to form a correct preference is insufficient, the correct vote is no vote. This is expressed by equal rankings, and when all rankings are equal it is expressed by no vote.

Comparison to first-past-the-post
At the Australian federal election in September 2013, 135 out of the 150 House of Representatives seats (or 90 percent) were won by the candidate who led on first preferences. The other 15 seats (10 percent) were won by the candidate who placed second on first preferences.

Variations 

A number of IRV methods, varying as to ballot design and as to whether or not voters are obliged to provide a full list of preferences, are in use in different countries and local governments.

In an optional preferential voting system, voters can give a preference to as many candidates as they wish. They may make only a single choice, known as "bullet voting", and some jurisdictions accept a single box marked with an "X" (as opposed to a numeral "1") as valid for the first preference. This may result in exhausted ballots, where all of a voter's preferences are eliminated before a candidate is elected, such that the "majority" in the final round may only constitute a minority fraction of all ballots cast. Optional preferential voting is used for elections for the President of Ireland and the New South Wales Legislative Assembly.  Optional preferential voting is used for some elections in Queensland.

In a full-preferential voting method, voters are required to mark a preference for every candidate standing. Ballots that do not contain a complete ordering of all candidates are in some jurisdictions considered spoilt or invalid, even if there are only two candidates standing. This can become burdensome in elections with many candidates and can lead to "donkey voting", in which some voters simply choose candidates at random or in top-to-bottom order, or a voter may order his or her preferred candidates and then fill in the remainder on a donkey basis. Full preferential voting is used for elections to the Australian federal parliament and for most State parliaments.

Other methods only allow marking preferences for a maximum of the voter's top three favorites, a form of partial preferential voting.

A version of instant-runoff voting applying to the ranking of parties was first proposed for elections in Germany in 2013 as spare vote.

Voting method criteria 
Scholars rate voting methods using mathematically derived voting method criteria, which describe desirable features of a method. No ranked-preference method can meet all of the criteria, because some of them are mutually exclusive, as shown by statements such as Arrow's impossibility theorem and the Gibbard–Satterthwaite theorem.

Many of the mathematical criteria by which voting methods are compared were formulated for voters with ordinal preferences. If voters vote according to the same ordinal preferences in both rounds, criteria can be applied to two-round systems of runoffs, and in that case, each of the criteria failed by IRV is also failed by the two-round system as they relate to automatic elimination of trailing candidates. Partial results exist for other models of voter behavior in the two-round method: see the two-round system article's criterion compliance section for more information.

A table summarising satisfaction of the criteria by IRV and other methods is shown in an appendix

Satisfied criteria 
The Condorcet loser criterion states that "if a candidate would lose a head-to-head competition against every other candidate, then that candidate must not win the overall election".  IRV (like all voting methods with a final runoff round) meets this criterion, since the Condorcet loser cannot win a runoff, however IRV can still elect the "second-worst" candidate, when the two worst candidates are the only ones remaining in the final round.

The independence of clones criterion states that "the election outcome remains the same even if an identical candidate who is equally preferred decides to run." IRV meets this criterion. The later-no-harm criterion states that "if a voter alters the order of candidates lower in his/her preference (e.g. swapping the second and third preferences), then that does not affect the chances of the most preferred candidate being elected."

The majority criterion states that "if one candidate is preferred by an absolute majority of voters, then that candidate must win." The mutual majority criterion states that "if an absolute majority of voters prefer every member of a group of candidates to every candidate not in that group, then one of the preferred group must win." Note that this is satisfied because when all but one candidate that a mutual majority prefer is eliminated, the votes of the majority all flow to the remaining candidate, in contrast to FPTP, where the majority would be treated as separate small groups. The resolvability criterion states that "the probability of an exact tie must diminish as more votes are cast."

Non-satisfied criteria

Condorcet winner criterion 

The Condorcet winner criterion states that "if a candidate would win a head-to-head competition against every other candidate, then that candidate must win the overall election". It is incompatible with the later-no-harm criterion, so IRV does not meet this criterion.

IRV is more likely to elect the Condorcet winner than plurality voting and traditional runoff elections. The California cities of Oakland, San Francisco and San Leandro in 2010 provide an example; there were a total of four elections in which the plurality-voting leader in first-choice rankings was defeated, and in each case the IRV winner was the Condorcet winner, including a San Francisco election in which the IRV winner was in third place in first choice rankings.

Systems which fail Condorcet but pass mutual majority can exclude voters outside the mutual majority from the vote, essentially becoming an election between the mutual majority. IRV demonstrates this exclusion of up to 50% of voters, notably in the 2009 Burlington, Vermont mayoral election where the later rounds became a runoff between the mutual majority of voters favoring Andy Montroll and Bob Kiss. This can recurse: if a mutual majority exists within the mutual majority, then the majority becomes a collegiate over the minority, and the inner mutual majority solely decides the votes of this collegiate.

Consistency criterion 

The consistency criterion states that if dividing the electorate into two groups and running the same election separately with each group returns the same result for both groups, then the election over the whole electorate should return this result. IRV, like all preferential voting methods which are not positional, does not meet this criterion.

Independence of irrelevant alternatives criterion 

The independence of irrelevant alternatives criterion states that "the election outcome remains the same even if a candidate who cannot win decides to run."  In the general case, instant-runoff voting can be susceptible to strategic nomination: whether or not a candidate decides to run at all can affect the result even if the new candidate cannot themselves win. This is much less likely to happen than under plurality.

Monotonicity criterion 

The monotonicity criterion states that "a voter can't harm a candidate's chances of winning by voting that candidate higher, or help a candidate by voting that candidate lower, while keeping the relative order of all the other candidates equal." Allard claims failure is unlikely, at a less than 0.03% chance per election. Some critics argue in turn that Allard's calculations are wrong and the probability of monotonicity failure is much greater, at 14.5% under the impartial culture election model in the three-candidate case, or 7–10% in the case of a left-right spectrum. Lepelley et al. find a 2–5% probability of monotonicity failure under the same election model as Allard. The diagram shows the non-monotonicity of IRV, where moving the center of opinion away from a candidate can help that candidate win, and moving the center of opinion towards a candidate can cause that candidate to lose.

Participation criterion 

The participation criterion states that "the best way to help a candidate win must not be to abstain". IRV does not meet this criterion: in some cases, the voter's preferred candidate can be best helped if the voter does not vote at all. Depankar Ray finds a 50% probability that, when IRV elects a different candidate than Plurality, some voters would have been better off not showing up.

Reversal symmetry criterion 

The reversal symmetry criterion states that "if candidate A is the unique winner, and each voter's individual preferences are inverted, then A must not be elected". IRV does not meet this criterion: it is possible to construct an election where reversing the order of every ballot paper does not alter the final winner.

Examples
Some examples of IRV elections are given below. The first two (fictional elections) demonstrate the principle of IRV. The others offer examples of the results of real elections.

Five voters, three candidates 

A simple example is provided in the accompanying table. Three candidates are running for election, Bob, Bill and Sue. There are five voters, "a" through "e". The voters each have one vote. They rank the candidates first, second and third in the order they prefer them. To win, a candidate must have a majority of vote; that is, three or more.

In Round 1, the first-choice rankings are tallied, with the results that Bob and Sue both have two votes and Bill has one. No candidate has a majority, so a second "instant runoff" round is required. Since Bill is in bottom place, he is eliminated. The ballot from any voter who ranked Bill first (in this example solely voter "c" ) gets modified as follows: the original 2nd choice candidate for that voter becomes their new 1st choice, and their original 3rd choice becomes their new 2nd choice.  This results in the Round 2 votes as seen below. This gives Sue 3 votes, which is a majority.

Tennessee capital election

Most instant-runoff voting elections are won by the candidate who leads in first-choice rankings, choosing the same winner as first-past-the-post voting. As an example Australia the 1972 federal election had the highest proportion of winners who would not have won under first past the post—with only 14 out of 125 seats not won by the plurality candidate.

Some IRV elections are won by a candidate who finishes second after the first-round count. In this case, IRV chooses the same winner as a two-round system if all voters were to vote again and maintain their same preferences. A candidate may also win who is in third place or lower after the first count, but gains majority support (among the non-eliminated candidates) in the final round. In such cases, IRV would choose the same winner as a multi-round method that eliminated the last-place candidate before each new vote, assuming all voters kept voting and maintained their same preferences. Here is an example of this last case.

It takes three rounds to determine a winner in this election.Round 1 – In the first round no city gets a majority:

If one of the cities had achieved a majority vote (more than half), the election would end there. If this were a first-past-the-post election, Memphis would win because it received the most votes. But IRV does not allow a candidate to win on the first round without having an absolute majority of the vote. While 42% of the electorate voted for Memphis, 58% of the electorate voted against Memphis in this first round.

Round 2 – In the second round of tabulation, we remove the city with the least first-place support from consideration. Chattanooga received the lowest number of votes in the first round, so it is eliminated. The ballots that listed Chattanooga as first choice are added to the totals of the second-choice selection on each ballot. Everything else stays the same.

Chattanooga's 15% of the total votes are added to the second choices selected by the voters for whom that city was first-choice (in this example Knoxville):

In the first round, Memphis was first, Nashville was second and Knoxville was third. With Chattanooga eliminated and its votes redistributed, the second round finds Memphis still in first place, followed by Knoxville in second and Nashville has moved down to third place. 

Round 3 – No city yet has secured a majority of votes, so we move to the third round with the elimination of Nashville, and it becomes a contest between Memphis and Knoxville.

As in the second round with Chattanooga, all of the ballots currently counting for Nashville are added to the totals of Memphis or Knoxville based on which city is ranked next on that ballot. In this example the second-choice of the Nashville voters is Chattanooga, which is already eliminated. Therefore, the votes are added to their third-choice: Knoxville.

The third round of tabulation yields the following result:

Result: Knoxville, which was running third in the first tabulation, has moved up from behind to take first place in the third and final round. The winner of the election is Knoxville. However, if 6% of voters in Memphis were to put Nashville first, the winner would be Nashville, a preferable outcome for voters in Memphis. This is an example of potential tactical voting, though one that would be difficult for voters to carry out in practice. Also, if 17% of voters in Memphis were to stay away from voting, the winner would be Nashville. This is an example of IRV failing the participation criterion.

For comparison, note that traditional first-past-the-post voting would elect Memphis, even though most citizens consider it the worst choice, because 42% is larger than any other single city. As Nashville is a Condorcet winner, Condorcet methods would elect Nashville. A two-round method would have a runoff between Memphis and Nashville where Nashville would win, too.

1990 Irish presidential election

The 1990 Irish presidential election provides an example of how instant-runoff voting can produce a different result from first-past-the-post voting. The three candidates were Brian Lenihan of the traditionally dominant Fianna Fáil party, Austin Currie of Fine Gael, and Mary Robinson, nominated by the Labour Party and the Workers' Party. After the first count, Lenihan had the largest share of the first-choice rankings (and hence would have won a first-past-the-post vote), but no candidate attained the necessary majority. Currie was eliminated and his votes reassigned to the next preference ranked on each ballot; in this process, Robinson received 82% of Currie's votes, thereby overtaking Lenihan.

2014 Prahran election (Victoria)
A real-life example of IRV producing a result which differs from what would be expected under a first-past-the-post or the two-round voting system is the result for the seat of Prahran in the 2014 Victorian state election. In this instance, it was the candidate who initially finished third (Greens candidate Sam Hibbins) in the primary vote went on to win the seat on the back of favourable preferences from the other two minor parties and independents, narrowly beating the second-ranked candidate (Labor candidate Neil Pharaoh) by 31 votes, and the first-ranked candidate (Liberal candidate Clem Newton-Brown) by 277 votes. It was not until the final round of counting that one of the two remaining candidates (Hibbins) had more than 50% of the total vote.

In theory, the elimination of the center-left Labor candidate before the left-wing Green candidate could have transferred enough votes to the center-right Liberal candidate for him to win, but instead roughly 8:1 Labor voters chose the Green ahead of the Liberal.

2009 Burlington mayoral election

Unlike Burlington's first IRV mayoral election in 2006, the IRV winner in 2009 (Bob Kiss) was neither the same as the plurality winner (Kurt Wright) nor the Condorcet winner (Andy Montroll). Burlington voters repealed IRV in 2010 by a vote of 52% to 48% and in 2021 voted to use RCV for city council elections by a vote of 64% to 36%.

The organization FairVote, which advocates for IRV, claimed the election as a success, citing three reasons (1) it prevented the election of the presumed winner under a plurality system by avoiding the effect of vote-splitting between the other candidates, (2) 99.99% of the ballots were valid suggesting that voters handled the system without difficulty, and (3) "contributed to producing a campaign among four serious candidates that was widely praised for its substantive nature."

However, the election was considered a failure by advocates of the Condorcet winner, who point out that "in a head-to-head election, Andy Montroll should have beaten Bob Kiss by a 7.8% margin".

In this case, a mutual majority causes a lock-out of a sufficiently large (e.g. plurality) minority.  In examples where a smaller minority would break the lock-out and would change the winner in their favor, the participation criterion is violated.  Wright voters were 40%, versus voters who placed Montroll and Kiss above Wright at 51.5%.  That means a lot of Wright voters would have had to stay home for their demographic to matter at all, causing a participation criterion failure. If Wright voters preferred Montroll over Kiss, it would have been more advantageous to abstain or not give Wright their first preference; this would then result in Montroll reaching the final runoff and beating Kiss (54% to 46%), as opposed to the actual final runoff between Wright and Kiss.

This would elect the candidate who started with only the third most primary votes, Montroll, and still would not be able to elect Wright without more of Montroll voters’ preferences or a higher primary vote (possibly to the point of having an outright majority)

Comparison to other preferential voting systems

See also
 Alternative vote plus (AV+), or alternative vote top-up, proposed by the Jenkins Commission in the UK
 Comparison of electoral systems
 First-past-the-post voting 
 None of the above (NOTA) or Re-open Nominations (RON)
 Outline of democracy
 Ranked-choice voting in the United States
 Ranked voting
 Single transferable vote, AV method for elections with multiple positions to be filled (for example the Australian Senate)

References

External links
 Preferential Voting at Australian Eelectoral Commission
 2010 articles from the Constitution Society and Electoral Reform Society summarizing the proposed change in the United Kingdom to IRV/Alternative Vote

Practice
 Advantages and disadvantages of AV from the ACE Project Electoral Design Reference Materials
 A Handbook of Electoral System Design from International IDEA
 Australian Electoral Commission Web Site 
 Australian Senate: 
 Australian House of Representatives: 
 Preferential Voting in Australia from Australian Politics.com
 San Francisco Department of Elections, California
 Alameda County Registrar of Voters, California
 City of Minneapolis, Minnesota
 Ranked Choice Voting Resource Center

Demonstrations and simulations
 The Star Tribune: How ranked-choice voting works – an interactive graphic
RankedVote — Online ranked-choice voting platform for voter education with detailed results animations and explanations.
RCV123.org - Free, non-profit site with on-line and paper ballot ranked-choice voting systems for any group vote. 
 AmericanQuorum.com A ranked-choice ballot tool from the Indaba Application Network, including the animated display of an instant runoff.
 BBC: Would the alternative vote have changed history?, illustration of how the results of the last six general elections might have looked had the 'alternative vote' system been in place.
 OpenSTV – Open source software for computing IRV and STV
 Favourite Futurama Character Poll
 Voting System Visualizations – 2-dimensional plots of results of various methods, with assumptions of sincere voting behavior.
 Simulation Of Various Voting Models for Close Elections Opposition article by Brian Olson.

Advocacy groups and positions
 Yes to Fairer Votes   campaign site for the Yes side of the 2011 United Kingdom Alternative Vote referendum
 Washington Post
 Ranked Choice Voting  at FairVote
 League of Women Voters of Vermont
 Ranked Choice Voting at [Represent.Us]
 InstantRunoff.com
 Ranked Ballot Initiative of Toronto, rabit.ca
 Roosevelt Institution
 Citizens for Voter Choice :: Massachusetts
 FairVote Minnesota
 Common Cause Massachusetts
 Brookings Institution's "Empowering Moderate Voters" paper
 Does the Alternative Vote Bring Tyranny to Australia? – Antony Green ABC

Opposition groups and positions
 Center for Election Science compares Instant runoff to Approval voting
 Fair Vote Canada paper on the Alternative Vote
 IRV page at the Center for Range Voting
 Instant Runoff Voting Report Values and Risks Report by the N.C. Coalition for Verified Voting

 
Non-monotonic electoral systems
Preferential electoral systems
Single-winner electoral systems